The Secret is a treasure hunt created by Byron Preiss. The hunt involves a search for twelve treasure boxes, the clues to which were provided in a book written by Preiss in 1982, also called The Secret. These boxes were buried at secret locations in cities across the United States and Canada that symbolically represent events and peoples that played significant roles in North American history. Anyone who uncovered one of the treasure boxes was entitled to exchange it with Preiss for a precious gem; after Preiss died in 2005, his estate assumed the responsibility of honoring the terms of the treasure hunt. As of 2023, only three of the twelve boxes have been found. Preiss kept no record of the treasure boxes' exact locations before his death, leaving it a possibility that the remaining boxes may never be recovered.

Book
Clues for where the treasures were buried are provided in a puzzle book named The Secret produced by Byron Preiss and first published by Bantam in 1982.  The book was authored by Sean Kelly and Ted Mann and illustrated by John Jude Palencar, John Pierard, and Overton Loyd; JoEllen Trilling, Ben Asen, and Alex Jay also contributed to the book. A Japanese version was published in 1983, and the English version was re-issued in 2014. The book contains 12 images and 12 verses; an image must be linked to a verse, with the information they contain used to locate a buried "treasure casque".

Treasure boxes
, three of the treasure boxes have been recovered. The first was found in Chicago, Illinois; the second in Cleveland, Ohio; and the most recent treasure box was found in Boston, Massachusetts. The remaining nine treasure boxes have not yet been recovered. The Boston treasure box's recovery was filmed for Discovery Channel's television show Expedition Unknown and aired on Wednesday, October 30, 2019.

With the passage of time, some of the cached casques may have been destroyed, or been built over, as was happening with the Boston casque, which was buried in Langone Park, in Boston’s North End which was undergoing renovation, resulting in the casque being dug up in an excavator. Clues would no longer match in cases where the surrounding area has changed since the book was originally published.

Note: This table is the consensus from the majority of searchers.
{| class="wikitable" style="text-align:left; font-size: 100%;"
|-
! Image No.
! Verse No.
! Verse opening
! Status
! Location (solved, or likely)
! Ref.
|-
| 1 || 7 || At stone wall's door  || bgcolor=red | Unsolved || San Francisco, California || 
|-
| 2 || 6 || Of all the romance retold || bgcolor=red | Unsolved || Charleston, South Carolina || 
|-
| 3 || 11 || Pass two friends of octave || bgcolor=red| Unsolved || Roanoke Island, North Carolina || 
|-
| 4 || 4 || Beneath two countries || bgcolor=Green | Solved (2004) || Cleveland, Ohio || 
|-
| 5 || 12 || Where M and B are set in stone || bgcolor=Green | Solved (1983) || Chicago, Illinois || 
|-
| 6 || 9 || The first chapter || bgcolor=red | Unsolved || St. Augustine, Florida  ||
|-
| 8 || 1 || Fortress north || bgcolor=Red | Unsolved || Houston, Texas || 
|-
| 10 || 8 || View the three stories of Mitchell' || bgcolor=red | Unsolved  || Milwaukee, Wisconsin || 
|-
| 9|| 5 || Lane || bgcolor=Red | Unsolved || Côte Saint-Luc, Montreal, Quebec || L
|-
| 7|| 2 || At the place where jewels abound || bgcolor=Red | Unsolved || New Orleans, Louisiana ||
|-
| 11 || 3 || If Thucydides is North of Xenophon || bgcolor=Green |Solved (2019) || Boston, Massachusetts || 
|-
| 12 || 10 || In the shadow Of the grey giant || bgcolor=red | Unsolved ||New York, New York || 
|}

 See also 

 Masquerade (book)
 A Treasure's Trove''

References

Further reading 
  (links Image 9 and Verse 7 to St. Louis)

External links 
 12treasures.com
 thesecret.pbworks.com
 thesecretatreasurehunt.com

Puzzle competitions
Outdoor locating games
1982 books